Melton "Shakir" Mustafa Sr. (November 23, 1947 – December 28, 2017) was an American jazz musician, music educator, and arranger who played the trumpet and flugelhorn.

Biography 
Mustafa, the younger brother of saxophonist Jesse Jones Jr., grew up in Miami, Florida, and learned the trumpet in middle school. As a teenager, he played in an RnB/calypso band led by his brother Jesse. He was a student at Berklee College of Music and at Mississippi Valley State College. He then earned a degree in music education at Florida A&M University. In the late 1960s, he worked in backing bands of soul musicians such as Sam & Dave, Betty Wright, Latimore, The Marvelettes, and Joe Simon. He eventually became active in the jazz scene of Miami and joined Ira Sullivan's band.

In the early 1980s, Mustafa played in Florida in Jaco Pastorius' Word of Mouth Band (Invitation, 1981), following up by performing with Bobby Watson and Randy Bernsen in New York City and from 1986 onward with the Count Basie Orchestra under the direction of Frank Foster (who was involved with recordings by Diane Schuur and Caterina Valente). He also worked with the Duke Ellington Orchestra, Woody Herman and His Orchestra, George Cables, John Hicks, Mingus Dynasty, and Gunther Schuller.

In 1995, Mustafa recorded the big band album Boiling Point (Contemporary) under his own name, followed by St. Louis Blues (1997). He also recorded with Eric Allison (Mean Streets Beat, 1996) and his brother Jesse Jones Jr. (Soul Serenade, 1996). His last album, The Travelling Man, was recorded in 2012. In the field of jazz, between 1980 and 2012, he was involved  in 32 recording sessions.

In later years, Mustafa was mainly active in Florida as a music teacher; He founded the program for jazz studies at Florida Memorial University in Miami Gardens. There was also an annual Melton Mustafa Jazz Festival in the 1990s, which also served as a fundraiser for college and high school jazz students. There, jazz greats such as Jon Faddis, Benny Golson, Grover Washington Jr., Wallace Roney, Patrice Rushen, Billy Cobham, Herbie Mann, Billy Taylor, Clark Terry and Randy Brecker performed. Mustafa died in 2017 in Miami from prostate cancer.

References

External links 
 Website
 
 

1947 births
2017 deaths
Musicians from Miami
American jazz music arrangers
African-American jazz musicians
American jazz educators
Afro Blue Band members
Florida A&M University alumni
Deaths from prostate cancer
20th-century African-American people
21st-century African-American people